Valentine Adolphus Titchmarsh (14 February 1853 – 11 October 1907) was a first-class cricketer and Test match umpire.  Born in 1853 in Hertfordshire, he played 8 matches for Marylebone Cricket Club and others between 1885 and 1891 as a right-arm quick bowler and left-handed batsman.  His best haul, 5 for 69, came against Cambridge University.  He played for his native minor county Hertfordshire County Cricket Club from 1876 to 1897.

Titchmarsh stood in 3 Test matches, on the Australian tours of England in 1899, 1902 and 1905.  He served as a first-class cricket umpire from 1882 to 1906 and died in 1907.

References and external links
 

1853 births
1907 deaths
Marylebone Cricket Club cricketers
Hertfordshire cricketers
English Test cricket umpires
North v South cricketers
United South of England Eleven cricketers